Strathblair  is a period TV drama, which aired on BBC Television from 1992 to 1993.

Premise
Set in the 1950s in the aftermath of World War II, newlywed couple Alec and Jennifer Ritchie (Derek Riddell and Francesca Hunt)
set up home on a dilapidated farm in the remote Scottish countryside in Perthshire. Life is not easy for these newcomers and their hostile neighbours are
keen to see them fail.

Cast
Derek Riddell as Alec Ritchie
Francesca Hunt as Jenny Ritchie
David Robb	as Andrew Menzies
Ian Carmichael as Sir James Menzies
Andrew Keir as Macrae of Balbuie
Alison Peebles as Pheemie Robertson
Kika Mirylees as Flora McInnes
Urbano Barberini as Umberto Fabiani
Neil McKinven as Robert Sinclair
Nicholas McArdle as Forbes

David Tennant had a brief appearance in Series 1 episode 'Family Affairs' as Archie the hiker, in what would be one of his earliest of many television roles. Episode director David Blair was so impressed by Tennant's performance that it led to him being awarded his first major TV role as the manic depressive Campbell in the BBC Scotland drama series Takin' Over the Asylum (1994)

Production
Strathblair was filmed mainly in and around Blair Atholl, a village in Perthshire, Scotland.
During filming of the first series, members of the cast and crew were attacked by a local man who drove through the middle of the set and threw a spanner at a female producer, which resulted in the perpetrator being given an official police warning.
To coincide with the lambing season, filming for the second series commenced in March 1992, two months before the first series aired on BBC1.

Reception
The first series was not well received by critics and experienced low ratings for a Sunday night prime time show, and despite bringing in a new writing team it was cancelled after the second series.

Merchandise
In 1992 Corgi Toys released a die cast two model set, consisting of a Strathblair Bedford OB Coach and a Morris J-type Van - Item model number 97765. The wording on the box read "STRATHBLAIR™ From the BBC television series created by Bill Craig".

Series 1 
Broadcast: 3 May 1992 - 19 July 1992 (10 episodes)

Series 2 
Broadcast: 27 June 1993 - 29 August 1993 (10 episodes)

References

External links
Strathblair at IMDb

1992 British television series debuts
1993 British television series endings
1990s British drama television series
BBC television dramas
BBC Scotland television shows
English-language television shows
Television shows set in Scotland